Tuffin is a surname. Notable people with the surname include: 

Alan Tuffin (1933–2017), British trade union leader
Richard Tuffin (born 1944), New Zealand rowing coxswain
Sally Tuffin (born 1938), English fashion designer and ceramicist

See also
Duffin
Ruffin (name)